Bruno Roque de Sousa or simply Bruno (born February 15, 1989 in Paraná) is a Brazilian defensive midfielder. He currently plays for PSTC in Brazil.

Playing career
Bruno Roque came through the youth team at Paraná Soccer Technical Center. He joined top team of Grêmio in 2007. In June, he moved to J1 League club, Kashiwa Reysol. End of 2007 season, he returned to Paraná Soccer Technical Center.

References

1989 births
Living people
Brazilian footballers
Expatriate footballers in Japan
Brazilian expatriate footballers
J1 League players
Kashiwa Reysol players
Association football midfielders